The 1993 World Rally Championship was the 21st season of the FIA World Rally Championship. The season consisted of 13 rallies. Juha Kankkunen won his fourth drivers' world championship in a Toyota Celica Turbo 4WD, ahead of François Delecour and Didier Auriol. The manufacturers' title was won by Toyota, ahead of Ford and Subaru.

Lancia dropped the Martini Racing works team, while the Lancia Delta continued through privateers Jolly Club and Astra Racing.

Regulation changes
 For the first time, all rounds of the championship counted towards both drivers' and manufacturers' championships.
 Each manufacturer had to register a team and nominate the drivers 30 days before each event to score points for the manufacturers' championship.

Teams and drivers

Results and standings

Manufacturers' championship

Drivers' championship

Events

External links 

 FIA World Rally Championship 1993 at ewrc-results.com

World Rally Championship
World Rally Championship seasons